TG2 (TeleGiornale 2) is the brand for the news programmes of Rai 2, the Italian state-owned television channel.  The programmes are shown several times throughout the day — domestically on Rai 2, and across Europe, Africa, Americas, Asia and Australasia on Rai Italia. It was launched in 1961 as Telegiornale del Secondo Programma before adopting its current name on 15 March 1976.

Editor and political leanings
The editor-in-chief of the programmes is Nicola Rao. The vice director is Carlo Pilieci. Originally TG2 was born politically near to the Italian Socialist Party (PSI), the Italian Republican Party (PRI) and the Italian Communist Party (PCI).

History and directors of TG2

Programme format
The programs are generally presented by a single newsreader but with additional newsreaders for sports features.  Most items are pre-recorded reports and are generally followed by a correspondent reporting live from the scene of the report.

It uses a one-line red scrolling news ticker which features breaking news.

Weekly programme

Edition and Presenters

TG2 Mattina
From Monday to Friday at 08:30 (about 10 minutes). Presenters:
Stefania Zane

TG2 Mattina Flash
From Monday to Friday  at 10:55 (about 5 minutes). Presenters:
Marzia Roncacci
Simonetta Guidotti

TG2 Giorno
From Monday to Sunday at 13:00 (about 30 minutes). Presenters:
Chiara Lico 
Francesca Romana Elisei  
Nadia Zicoschi  
Piergiorgio Giacovazzo
Fabio Chiucconi
Laura Pintus

TG2 Flash L.I.S./TG2 18:15
From Monday to Sunday at 17:55 and 18:00 on weekends. Presenters:  
Carola Carulli
Elisabetta Migliorelli
Chiara Prato
Daniele Rotondo
Silvia Vaccarezza
Marzia Roncacci

TG2 ore 20:30
From Monday to Sunday at 20:30 (about 24–33 minutes). Presenters:
Adele Ammendola 
Maria Concetta Mattei  
Luca Salerno
Maurizio Martinelli
Dario Laruffa
Manuela Moreno
Ilaria Capitani

See also 
Rai 2

External links
tg2.rai.it, official website

Rai (broadcaster)
Italian television news shows
1961 Italian television series debuts
1960s Italian television series
1970s Italian television series
1980s Italian television series
1990s Italian television series
2000s Italian television series
2010s Italian television series